{{DISPLAYTITLE:C21H32N2O}}
The molecular formula C21H32N2O (molar mass: 328.49 g/mol) may refer to:

 77-LH-28-1
 Prodiame, or 17β-((3-aminopropyl)amino)estradiol
 Stanozolol

Molecular formulas